A wheelbarrow race is a competitive game in which teams of two players race with one teammate playing the role of the driver, and the other playing the role of the wheelbarrow. The driver holds on to the other player's ankles, while the other player walks with his hands. In the Midwestern United States it is commonly played at fairs and family events.

See also
Sack race
Three-legged race
Wheelbarrow Olympics

Games of physical skill
Novelty running